WAMV (1420 kHz) is a commercial AM radio station licensed to Amherst, Virginia, serving Amherst County and the suburbs of Lynchburg.  WAMV is owned and operated by Community First Broadcasters, Inc.  It broadcasts a Southern Gospel and Christian talk and teaching radio format.  The studios and offices are on School Road in Amherst.

By day, WAMV is powered at 2,200 watts non-directional.  But to protect other stations on 1420 AM from interference, at night it reduces power to only 47 watts.  The AM transmitter is on Higginbotham Creek Road in Sweet Briar.  Programming is also heard on 250-watt FM translator W276DN at 103.1 MHz in Amherst.

References

External links
 WAMV 1420 Online

1976 establishments in Virginia
Southern Gospel radio stations in the United States
Talk radio stations in the United States
Radio stations established in 1976
AMV